The Washington Secondary Rail Trail (also known as the Washington Secondary Bike Path) is a rail trail located in Rhode Island.

The trail measures   and has sections that are paved and unpaved. It runs along an abandoned rail corridor of the former Hartford, Providence and Fishkill Railroad.

The trail serves the communities of Coventry, West Warwick, Warwick, and Cranston. It combines, from west to east, the Trestle Trail, Trestle Trail East, Coventry Greenway, West Warwick Greenway, Warwick Greenway, and Cranston Bike Path.

Long-term plans envision the Washington Secondary Rail Trail connecting with the Blackstone River Bikeway, the East Bay Bike Path, and the Moosup Valley State Park Trail in Connecticut. The Washington Secondary Rail Trail is a designated section of the East Coast Greenway.

Coventry section

 Coventry
 distance 

The Washington Secondary Bike Path starts near the Summit General Store on Log Bridge Road at the south/western paved end of the Coventry segment. West of this point, the trail is known as the Trestle Trail to the Connecticut state line. Over the duration of the 4.0 paved miles, the Coventry greenway passes alongside the Flat River Reservoir, Knotty Oak Cemetery, the Merrill S. Whipple Conservation Area, and the upper branch of the Pawtuxet river over 4 bridges (3 water, 1 road, 1 of them a truss design). The path follows the direction of RI 117.

In 2014, the original Coventry Greenway section was rehabilitated, and the  Trestle Trail East section was added, extending the western end by almost five miles.

Trestle Trail crossings (unpaved)

Paved crossings

West Warwick section

 West Warwick
 distance 

The West Warwick Greenway segment is fully paved, from the Coventry section to the Warwick leg. The right of way passes by the commercial district of Arctic. Along the trail are two mills, one commercial/industry and one residential (Royal Mills, Ace Dying Mill complex). Bradford Soap Works straddles the greenway not far after.

Crossings

Warwick section

 Warwick
 distance 

The Warwick Greenway provides an almost direct connection to Bald Hill road and the Malls; (RI and Warwick). Another truss bridge is on the path nearby the West Warwick sewer treatment facility (the township line is nearby the greenway).

Crossings

Cranston section

 Cranston
 distance 

The Cranston Bike Path is the longest paved section, the greenway passes through Oaklawn, Knightsville and the Gladstone sections of Cranston. The northern terminus at the moment ends at the northern end of Garfield avenue, at the Cranston Police department. The right of way, accessible almost up to the tracks continues north for .33 miles until it merges with Amtrak's Northeast Corridor.

Crossings

See also

 Blackstone River Bikeway
 East Bay Bike Path
 Greenways Alliance of Rhode Island

References

External links
 

Coventry, Rhode Island
Cranston, Rhode Island
Rail trails in Rhode Island
East Coast Greenway
Warwick, Rhode Island
West Warwick, Rhode Island